Martin Wong (July 11, 1946 – August 12, 1999) was a Chinese-American painter of the late 20th century. His work has been described as a meticulous blend of social realism and visionary art styles. Wong's paintings often explored multiple ethnic and racial identities, exhibited cross-cultural elements, demonstrated multilingualism, and celebrated his queer sexuality.

Biography

Early years
Martin Wong was born in Portland, Oregon on July 11, 1946. An only child, Wong was raised by his parents Benjamin and Florence Wong Fie in the Chinatown district of San Francisco. Demonstrating a proclivity for artistic expression at an early age, Wong started to paint at the age of 13. His mother was a strong supporter of his artistic inclinations and kept much of his early work. Wong attended George Washington High School, graduating in 1964. He continued his education at Humboldt State University, graduating with a bachelor's degree in Ceramics in 1968. Through college and for another 10 years, Wong traveled between Eureka and San Francisco practicing his artistic craft. During this time, Wong had an apartment in San Francisco's Haight-Ashbury neighborhood and was active in the Bay Area art scene, including stints as a set designer for the performance art group The Angels of Light, an offshoot of The Cockettes. While involved with The Angels of Light, Wong participated in the emerging hippie movement and engaged in the period's climate of sexual freedom and experimentation with psychedelic drugs. By the late 70s, Wong made the decision to move to New York to pursue his career as an artist. According to Wong, his move to New York was precipitated by a friendly challenge:

Career

In 1978 Wong moved to Manhattan, settling in the Lower East Side, where his attention turned exclusively to painting. Largely self-taught, Wong's paintings ranged from gritty renderings of the decaying Lower East Side to playful depictions of New York's and San Francisco's Chinatowns, to Traffic Signs for the Hearing Impaired. In self-describing the subject matter of some of his paintings, Wong said: "Everything I paint is within four blocks of where I live and the people are the people I know and see all the time."

Wong is perhaps best known for his collaborations with Nuyorican poet Miguel Piñero. He met Piñero in 1982 on the opening night of the group exhibition Crime Show, held at ABC No Rio. Shortly after meeting, Piñero moved into Wong's apartment where he lived for the next year and a half. Wong credited Piñero with enabling him to feel more integrated into the Latino community. While they lived together, Wong produced a significant body of work that he eventually displayed in his exhibition Urban Landscapes at Barry Blinderman's Semaphore Gallery in 1984. Their collaborative paintings often combined Piñero's poetry or prose with Wong's painstaking cityscapes and stylized fingerspelling. Wong's Loisaida pieces and collaborations with Piñero formed part of the Nuyorican arts movement.

Wong held a solo exhibition titled Chinatown Paintings at the San Francisco Art Institute in 1993 that showcased his own memories, experiences and interpretations of the "mythical quality of Chinatown." Wong exemplified "a tourist idea, an outsider's view" of Chinatown that was prevalent for those distant from the reality of the city.

For a time in the 1980s, he made ends meet by buying underpriced antiquities at Christie's and selling them at Sotheby's for a fairer price. Wong amassed a sizable graffiti collection while living in New York and with the help of a Japanese investor, he co-founded with his friend Peter Broda the Museum of American Graffiti on Bond Street in the East Village in 1989. During this time, graffiti was a highly contested form of art and city officials had removed much of what had been in the New York City Subway system. In response, Wong set out to preserve what he considered to be "the last great art movement of the twentieth century." In 1994, following complications in his health, Wong donated his graffiti collection to the Museum of the City of New York. Among his collection were pieces from 1980s New York-based graffiti artists, including Rammellzee, Keith Haring, Futura 2000, Lady Pink, and Lee Quiñones.

Personal life
Wong was openly gay. In 1994 Wong was diagnosed with AIDS. With his health in decline following the diagnosis, he moved back to San Francisco. He died under the care of his parents in their San Francisco home at the age of 53 from an AIDS related illness on August 12, 1999. Miguel Piñero, Wong's former partner, died a decade earlier in 1988 from cirrhosis.

Wong's aunt, Eleanor "Nora" Wong, was an active participant in the San Francisco Chinese nightclub scene in the 1940s. She most notably had a host of duties, including principal singer, at Forbidden City.

Legacy 
Wong was acknowledged in a New York Times obituary as an artist "whose meticulous visionary realism is among the lasting legacies of New York's East Village art scene of the 1980s". Critical esteem has sustained since his death, and Wong's works can be found in collections worldwide, including the collections of the Metropolitan Museum of Art, the de Young Museum, the Bronx Museum of the Arts, the Syracuse University Art Collection and in the cities of New York and San Francisco. The Martin Wong Papers reside at the Fales Library, New York University, and include among other things sketchbooks, correspondence, biographical documents, videocassette recordings, photographs, graffiti-related materials, and parts of Wong's personal library.
The catalog of a joint exhibition of Wong's work at the New Museum of Contemporary Art and the Illinois State University Galleries was published by Rizzoli in 1998 in Sweet Oblivion: The Urban Landscape of Martin Wong.

Two of Martin Wong's paintings are in the collection of the Whitney Museum in New York City. The Museum of Modern Art has three of Wong's works in its permanent collection. One of his paintings is in the collection of the state of California and displayed permanently at the California State Building in San Francisco. The Society of Contemporary Art at the Art Institute of Chicago acquired the painting "Sweet Oblivion" in May 2012.

Martin Wong has had collaborations with the clothing brand Supreme, which released a number of items such as an 8 ball shirt, with some of his art as a graphic on the piece, and an 8 ball hoodie of the same design, among many other pieces.

Founded by his mother in 2001, the Martin Wong Foundation was created to help fund art programs and young artists through collegiate art scholarships, art publications and active art education programs. Since 2003, the scholarships have continued to be offered at Humboldt State University, Wong's alma mater, San Francisco State University, New York University, and Arizona State University.

The exhibition Martin Wong: Malicious Mischief, Curated by Krist Gruijthuijsen and Agustín Pérez Rubio, is being presented at the Museo Centro de Arte Dos de Mayo in Spain from November 2022 to January 2023. After Museo CA2M, the exhibition will travel to KW Institute for Contemporary Art in Berlin, from 25 February to 14 May 2023; Camden Art Centre in London from 7 July to 17 September 2023; and Stedelijk Museum in Amsterdam from November 2023 to February 2024.

See also
 Julie Ault
 American Sign Language
 List of LGBT people from Portland, Oregon

References

External links
 Martin Wong Foundation

1946 births
1999 deaths
20th-century American painters
20th-century American male artists
American male painters
California State Polytechnic University, Humboldt alumni
American people of Chinese descent
American gay artists
Artists from Portland, Oregon
Artists from San Francisco
American LGBT people of Asian descent
LGBT people from Oregon
AIDS-related deaths in California
20th-century American LGBT people